The 1922 New Zealand general election was held on Monday, 6 December in the Māori electorates, and on Tuesday, 7 December in the general electorates to elect a total of 80 MPs to the 21st session of the New Zealand Parliament. A total number of 700,111 (87.7%) voters turned out to vote. In one seat (Bay of Plenty) there was only one candidate.

1922 was the year residents of the Chatham Islands were enfranchised for the first time (included in Lyttelton and Western Māori electorates).

Result

William Massey formed a government, but with the loss in support for the Reform Party he had to negotiate for support with Independents, and with two Liberal Party members.

Liberal was in decline and disorganised. Just before the 1925 election (held on 4 November), two Liberal MPs from Christchurch who had supported Massey (along with Independents Harry Atmore and Allen Bell) were appointed to the Legislative Council. They were Leonard Isitt and George Witty who were both appointed to the Legislative Council by Gordon Coates on 28 October 1925. Both were Liberals and their retirement removed "a source of some bitterness from the Party’s ranks (Coates rewarded them with seats in the Legislative Council the day after the election)". Gordon Coates was Reform, and both of their seats went to Reform candidates in 1925.

Party Totals

Party totals

*Note: For numbers of candidates see Wilson (1985) p. 295; for numbers of votes and percentage see Wilson (1985) p. 289. Electorate results given below include 38 Reform and 21 Liberal members. The figures given in the table agree with Mackie and Rose, as well as the article on New Zealand elections.

Votes summary

Electorate results

The results of the 1922 election were as follows:

Key

|-
 |colspan=8 style="background-color:#FFDEAD" | General electorates
|-

|-
 |colspan=8 style="background-color:#FFDEAD" | Māori electorates
|-

|}

Summary of changes
A boundary redistribution resulted in the abolition of one seat:
, held by John Edie

At the same time, one new seat was created:

Notes

References